Grand Synagogue of Edirne, aka Adrianople Synagogue (Hebrew:) is a historic Sephardi synagogue located in Maarif Street of Edirne, Turkey. It was designed in the Moorish Revival style and restored in 2015.

History
The  destroyed more than 1,500 houses and also damaged several synagogues in the city. The twenty-thousand strong Jewish community urgently needed a place of worship. Following the permission of the Ottoman Government and the edict of Sultan Abdul Hamid II, the construction of a new synagogue began on January 6, 1906, at the site of the ruined synagogues Mayor and Pulya in Suriçi (Citadel) neighborhood. It was designed by the French architect France Depré in the architectural style of the Sephardi Leopoldstädter Tempel in Vienna, Austria. Costing 1,200 gold coins, it was opened to service on the eve of Pesach (Passover) in April 1909. Capable of accommodating up to 1,200 worshipers (900 men and 300 women), it was Europe's third-largest temple and the largest in Turkey.

In 1983, the synagogue was abandoned after most of the Jewish community left the city, emigrating to Israel, Europe, or North America. In 1995, the temple by law came under the control of the governmental Turkish Foundations Institution.

Restoration
The abandoned and ruined synagogue as well as its outbuilding were restored by the Turkish Foundations Institution in five years, spending 5,750,000 (approximately US$2.5 million). On March 26, 2015, the synagogue was reopened with a celebration and a Shacharit, morning prayer service, attended by a large number of Jews including Ishak Ibrahimzadeh (leader of the Jewish community in Turkey), Rav Naftali Haleva, deputy to Hakham Bashi (Chief Rabbi) Ishak Haleva, Bülent Arınç, Deputy Prime Minister of Turkey, and some other Turkish high officials. The worship was overseen by Rabbi David Azuz, who had led the service on the closing day 36 years before. The Municipality of Edirne hung a banner in the street of the synagogue and greeted the guests with the words "Welcome home, our old neighbors".

Gallery

See also
 List of synagogues in Turkey

References

External links

 The Jewish community of Edirne, at the Jewish Virtual Library
 Chief Rabbinate of Turkey
 Shalom Newspaper - The main Jewish newspaper in Turkey
 Pictures of the synagogue before and after restoration

Synagogues in Turkey
Buildings and structures in Edirne
Synagogues completed in 1909
Sephardi Jewish culture in Turkey
Sephardi synagogues
Tourist attractions in Edirne
Rebuilt synagogues
Moorish Revival synagogues
20th-century religious buildings and structures in Turkey